Miss Teen Supranational is an international teen beauty contest.

The current titleholder is Frany Delgado of Ecuador who was crowned on October 19, 2022, in Guayaquil, Ecuador.

Titleholders 

1Judging of the competition took place outside of the normal pageant environment due to the global restrictions on public events and international travel imposed by the Covid-19 pandemic. The winner was crowned in a live-streamed event.

Countries/Territory by winning number

See also
Miss Teen Ecuador

References

External links
 Miss Teen Supranational Official Site

Beauty pageants in Ecuador
Ecuadorian awards
International beauty pageants
Beauty pageants for youth